The Forester's Daughter is a 1952 West German musical comedy film directed by Arthur Maria Rabenalt and starring Johanna Matz, Karl Schönböck and Will Quadflieg. It is based on the 1907 operetta Die Försterchristl, which is set in the Austrian Empire during Franz Josef's reign. The film is part of the operetta film subgenre.

It was shot at the Bavaria Studios in Munich and on location around Bad Tölz. The film's sets were designed by Robert Herlth.

Cast
Johanna Matz as Försterchristl
Karl Schönböck as Kaiser Franz Josef
Will Quadflieg as Joseph Földessy aka Hauptmann Koltai
Angelika Hauff as Ilona
Käthe von Nagy as Gräfin Josefine
Oskar Sima as Leisinger
Ulrich Beiger as Simmerl
Harry Halm as Oberhofmeister
Willem Holsboer as Hütl
Iván Petrovich as Graf Paalen
 as Hauptmann der Leibgarde
Harald Mannl as Wirt
Jochen Hauer as Förster

References

External links

1950s historical musical films
German historical musical films
West German films
Films directed by Arthur Maria Rabenalt
Films set in Austria
Films set in the 1850s
Operetta films
Films based on operettas
Films about royalty
German black-and-white films
1950s German films
Films shot at Bavaria Studios